Jericho (Pronunciation: -'jer-i-"kO) is an estate in Nairobi, Kenya just east of the Nairobi Province. It is a constituent of Makadara Constituency. 
Ofafa Jericho and Jericho Lumumba are located in the Eastlands suburbs of Nairobi , neighbouring, Makadara,Buru Buru, Harambee, Uhuru, Maringo and Jerusalem Estates.

Housing 

After Kenya’s independence, Jericho was formed as a settlement specifically for the African working class. It was built with help from the Israeli government. Jericho houses are currently owned by the Nairobi City County, which is led by a Governor.  All of the homes are the same shape and size. They are double storied houses with one tenant living on the ground floor and another on the top floor. Most of the area’s companies use the outside of these houses as advertising space and in return they paint the inside of the home for the resident(s). Most of these houses are occupied by young men who have inherited the homes from their parents who have either relocated to the rural areas or died. Due to lack of constant income, many home owners rent rooms within the houses for profit. The tenants pay an average of KSh.2,500–3,000/= for their occupancy.

Society and culture 

The Jericho area is occupied by almost all tribes in Kenya.  The primary language of its inhabitants is called (Sheng) which is a mixture of English, Swahili and various vernacular languages. The average age of Jericho inhabitants is 35 years.  The children of these residents attend city council schools which paid for by the government. With respect to healthcare, with the increase in healthcare education and services to this city, the prevalence of health concerns like HIV/AIDS and infant mortality has dropped significantly.

Business and economy 

The average pay for a Jeri resident is around KSh.20,000/= and they use approximately KSh.100/= daily for food in a day. Employment in Jericho centers around cottage industries, short contracts in the transport business, and FMCG vending. Some of the residents are mid-tire working class citizens but most also self-employed in small-medium enterprises. The youth of Jericho have also started various youth ventures such as garbage collection and car mechanical repairs.

Notable people from Jericho 

Jericho was home to the late Kisoi Munyao,  the man who hoisted the Kenyan Flag on Mt. Kenya on 12 December 1963 during independence day. It was also home to the late, the late Bildad Kaggia, Mzee Teacher (Karate legend).  Robert Napunyi Wangila is still the only Kenyan Olympic boxing gold medalist even 22 years after his death.  He was a celebrated Kenyan boxer who won gold medal in 1988 summer Olympic games.  He was born and raised in Jericho estate in Nairobi. and many others..

It was the home of Barack Obama, Sr., a senior economist in the Kenyan Ministry of Finance, his first wife, and their children. Obama is the father of United States President Barack Obama by his  second wife.

Jericho is known to be the home of many famous Kenyan football players.  The main football field in Jericho, otherwise known as "TOYOYO STADIUM" has produced many players that have gone on to play in the Kenyan national team (Harambee Stars) and also professionally in Europe.  Most notable among these are John "Shoto" Lukoye, Benard "Zico" Otieno, Jacob "Ghost" Mulee, George Olubendi among others.

References 

Suburbs of Nairobi